Poperechnoye (Tailuud) is a rural locality (a selo) in Yeravninsky District, Republic of Buryatia, Russia. The population is 383, as of 2010. There are 15 streets.

Geography 
Poperechnoye is located 60 km southwest of Sosnovo-Ozerskoye (the district's administrative centre) by road. Mozhayka is the nearest rural locality.

References 

Rural localities in Yeravninsky District